William Shirmer Barker (born 1934) is an American church historian, educator, and leader.

Barker studied at Princeton University, Cornell University, Covenant Theological Seminary, and Vanderbilt University. He taught at Covenant College before moving to Covenant Theological Seminary in 1972. In 1977 he succeeded Robert G. Rayburn as President of Covenant Seminary, and served in this position until 1984. He then took up a position as editor of Presbyterian Journal, before returning to teaching, this time at Westminster Theological Seminary.

In 1994, Barker was elected Moderator of the Presbyterian Church in America.

References

1934 births
Living people
Presbyterian Church in America ministers
Historians of Christianity
Presidents of Calvinist and Reformed seminaries
Princeton University alumni
Covenant Theological Seminary alumni
Cornell University alumni
Vanderbilt University alumni
Covenant Theological Seminary faculty
Westminster Theological Seminary faculty
Academic journal editors
Editors of Christian publications
American historians of religion